Xu Dazhe (born September 1956) is a Chinese politician and aerospace engineer. He was CPC Secretary of Hunan province. Previously, he was the Governor of Hunan.

Biography
Born in Nanchang, Jiangxi province in 1956, he is a native of Liuyang, Hunan province. Xu obtained a bachelor's and a master's degree in engineering from the Harbin Institute of Technology. He joined the Communist Party in 1982. Xu began his career in the Ministry of Aerospace Industry in 1984 as a technical designer, then was promoted to lead individual projects. Xu also has experience as the head of a rocket construction team. The ministry was eventually spun off as a state-owned enterprise and governed as a corporation. In 2007, Xu was named chief executive and head of the party group of the China Aerospace Science & Industry Corporation, promoted in April 2013 to chairman of the board.

In 2013 he was named vice minister of Industry and Information Technology, chief administrator of the China National Space Administration, and the head of the State Administration for Science, Technology and Industry for National Defence. In September 2016, he was appointed the acting governor of his home province, Hunan. He was the 18th person since 1949 to serve as Governor of Hunan. Xu followed in the footsteps of prominent colleagues such as Ma Xingrui and Chen Qiufa in making the transition from aerospace to politics.

In November 2020, Xu was appointed as the CPC Secretary of Hunan.

On 23 October 2021, he was appointed vice chairperson of the National People's Congress Education, Science, Culture and Public Health Committee.

Xu was a member of the 17th Central Commission for Discipline Inspection, and is a member of the 18th Central Committee of the Chinese Communist Party.

References

China National Space Administration people
Living people
1956 births
Scientists from Hunan
People from Liuyang
Members of the 18th Central Committee of the Chinese Communist Party
Members of the 19th Central Committee of the Chinese Communist Party
Chinese aerospace engineers
Harbin Institute of Technology alumni
Engineers from Hunan
Chinese Communist Party politicians from Hunan
People's Republic of China politicians from Hunan
Politicians from Changsha